is a 2001 Japanese television film by TBS.

Plot

Cast
 Tomohisa Yamashita as Ken Nagashima
 Shunsuke Kazama as Koiichi
 Risa Nishimura  as Kira Mizusawa
 Yūko Asano as Naoko Nagashima
 Masato Furuoya as Mr. Nagashima
 Masahiko Tsugawa as Dr. Watanuki
 Saki Takaoka as Teacher Miyada
 Erina Asai as Hikari Nagashima
 Kusami Nakane as Jun Nagashima
 Junnosuke Taguchi

References

Japanese drama television series
TBS Television (Japan) dramas
2001 films